Donde termina el camino is a Mexican telenovela directed by Antulio Jiménez Pons for Canal de las Estrellas in 1978.

Cast 
Lupita Lara - Patricia Alconedo
Alfredo Leal - Gerardo Alconedo
Raphael - Manuel
Maricruz Olivier
Eduardo Alcaraz - "El Bacanora"
Lilia Aragón - María Teresa de Alconedo
Miguel Macía
Gonzalo Vega - Gino Gutiérrez
Fernando Saenz - Rolando "El Gato"
Nerina Ferrer - Dolores
Carlos Ignacio - Armando
Guillermo Zarur - Padre Juan Pablo
Rafael Llamas
Isabela Corona - Doña Lucía vda. de Alconedo
Alicia Montoya
Salvador Sánchez
Sara Guash
Carmen Cortéz
Margarita Hermann
Armando Alcazar
Ramón Menéndez - Roque
Manuel Landeta

References

External links 
 

Mexican telenovelas
1978 telenovelas
Televisa telenovelas
Spanish-language telenovelas
1978 Mexican television series debuts
1978 Mexican television series endings